Robat-e Qaleqan (also Romanized as Robāţ-e Qāleqān and Robāţ-e Qālqān; also known as Robat Ghalghan) is a village in Kenarrudkhaneh Rural District, in the Central District of Golpayegan County, Isfahan Province, Iran. At the 2006 census, its population was 87, in 30 families.

See also
Robat (disambiguation)

References

Populated places in Golpayegan County